An S bridge is a bridge whose alignment follows a reverse curve, like the letter "S" in plan.

S Bridge may also refer to:

 Claysville S Bridge in Washington County, Pennsylvania
 S Bridge (Womelsdorf, Pennsylvania)
 S Bridge II near New Concord, Ohio